Phil Kite (born 26 October 1962) is a former football goalkeeper, goalkeeping coach and physiotherapist. He retired in 2015 from his role as physio at Bristol Rovers, the club he supported as a boy.

Playing career
Born in Bristol, England, Kite joined Bristol Rovers as an apprentice goalkeeper in 1979, and signed his first professional contract on his 18th birthday in October 1980. After making 96 league appearances for Rovers, he moved on to Southampton. He went on to make league appearances for thirteen different clubs, but missed a large amount of playing time through injury, and only a two-year spell at Gillingham saw him play regularly as an established first-choice keeper. In 1996, he left Bristol City to re-join his first club, Bristol Rovers, as physio, goalkeeping coach and backup goalkeeper.

Physio career
Kite began studying towards his physiotherapy qualification in 1991 and completed his studies in 1995. Since re-joining Bristol Rovers he has retired from playing, and relinquished his coaching duties to Steve Book. He worked exclusively as the club's physio until 2015 when he announced his retirement. His final game serving Rovers was the 2015 Conference Premier play-off Final at Wembley Stadium. As a thank you for Kite's 24 years of combined service to Bristol Rovers, he was granted a testimonial to be played against West Bromwich Albion, managed by Kite's good friend and former Rovers player Tony Pulis.

References

External links

1962 births
Living people
Footballers from Bristol
English footballers
Association football goalkeepers
Bristol Rovers F.C. players
Southampton F.C. players
Middlesbrough F.C. players
Gillingham F.C. players
AFC Bournemouth players
Sheffield United F.C. players
Mansfield Town F.C. players
Plymouth Argyle F.C. players
Rotherham United F.C. players
Crewe Alexandra F.C. players
Stockport County F.C. players
Cardiff City F.C. players
Bristol City F.C. players
Bristol Rovers F.C. non-playing staff
English football managers